Leszek Bandach (born 3 June 1960) is a Polish fencer. He competed in the individual and team foil events at the 1988 Summer Olympics.

References

1960 births
Living people
Polish male fencers
Olympic fencers of Poland
Fencers at the 1988 Summer Olympics
People from Zielona Góra
Sportspeople from Lubusz Voivodeship